Raymond Samuel Ratzlaff (April 10, 1931 – February 1, 2019) was a politician from Alberta, Canada. He served in the Legislative Assembly of Alberta from 1967 to 1971 as a member of the Social Credit caucus in government. He served in the cabinet of Premier Harry Strom from 1969 to 1971.

Political career
Ratzlaff first ran for a seat to the Alberta Legislature in the 1967 general election, as a Social Credit candidate in the electoral district of Three Hills. He defeated three other candidates with over half the popular vote to hold the seat for his party.

On May 27, 1969 Ratzlaff was appointed Minister of Industry and Tourism by Premier Harry Strom.  In the 1971 general election he was defeated by Progressive Conservative candidate Allan Warrack by just eight votes. He died in 2019 at the age of 87.

References

External links
Legislative Assembly of Alberta Members Listing

Alberta Social Credit Party MLAs
1931 births
2019 deaths
Members of the Executive Council of Alberta